The Bear Lake Club, Ltd., Clubhouse near Tallulah, Louisiana was built around 1905 and was listed on the National Register of Historic Places on March 2, 2001.

It is located near where Bear Lake enters into Roundaway Bayou.  It is much like a simple camp house. The main block of the clubhouse survives, although in 2001 it was deteriorated, with its most distinctive feature being its double-pitched, umbrella-like hipped roof.

See also
 National Register of Historic Places listings in Madison Parish, Louisiana

References

National Register of Historic Places in Louisiana
Madison Parish, Louisiana
Buildings and structures completed in 1905
Clubhouses in Louisiana
Clubhouses on the National Register of Historic Places
1905 establishments in Louisiana